Lake Rudnickie Wielkie is a lake located within the boundaries of Grudziądz, Poland. The average duration of the ice cover on the lake in the years 1960–1970 was 130 days.

There are numerous holiday resorts, sport and tourism equipment rentals, small catering facilities, campsites, beaches, rowing marinas and sailing centres on the shores of the lake. It is surrounded by forests. It is a place willingly visited by the people of Grudziądz and beyond, both in summer and in other seasons.

Sources 

 Otremba Z., Miejscowości powiatu grudziądzkiego, Gdańsk: wyd. Regnum, 2002, OCLC 830373351.

Grudziądz